Tom Rosenbauer is a fly fishing mentor and author who currently works and resides in the Manchester, Vermont area. He has published books for Orvis, which he has been with for over 30 years.

Rosenbauer is also the host of the Orvis Fly Fishing Guide Podcast which has been syndicated on the Internet since April 2008.

Selected works
 The Orvis Guide to Small Stream Fly Fishing
 The Orvis Guide to the Essential American Flies (October 2011)
 The Orvis Guide to Prospecting for Trout: How to Catch Fish When There's No Hatch to Match, Revised Edition
 The Orvis Fly-Fishing Guide, Completely Revised and Updated with Over 400 New Color Photos and Illustrations
 The Orvis Guide To Reading Trout Streams
 The Orvis Fly-Tying Guide (winner of the 2001 National Outdoor Book Award (Instructional))
 The Orvis Guide to Beginning Fly Fishing: 101 Tips for the Absolute Beginner
 Casting Illusions: The World of Fly-Fishing
 Fly Fishing In America
 The Orvis Fly-Fishing Guide Podcast (2008 - present)

References

Angling writers
American fishers
Living people
Year of birth missing (living people)
Place of birth missing (living people)
People from Manchester, Vermont
Writers from Vermont